Zalambessa (Tigrigna: ዛላምበሳ) is a town located in Tigray, Ethiopia. Zalambessa is part of the Misraqawi (Eastern) Zone of the Tigray Region. It is about 42 kilometers north of Adigrat. The Serha-Zalambesa border crossing is located in the town.

History

Origins 
Zalambessa was a village that was fortified by Italian colonial forces.

20th Century 
The fortifications were taken over by the Ethiopian military in 1952 when Eritrea was federated with Ethiopia. The older village (Tsorona) remained under Eritrean Administration. 

During the Ethiopian Civil War, on 15 November 1989, Zalambessa was bombed from the air by the Ethiopian Air Force; no fatalities reported.

The exact border became an issue before and during the Eritrean-Ethiopian War (1998–2000). After the war, the town was in ruins.

21st Century 
In 2000, Eritrea and Ethiopia signed the Algiers Agreement (2000) which forwarded the border dispute to a The Hague boundary commission. In the Agreement both parties agreed in advance to comply with the ruling of the Border Commission. In 2002, the commission ruling, reconfirmed and made more precise in their final ruling effective November 2007, placed Tsorona inside Eritrean territory, and Zalambessa inside Ethiopian territory.

According to the Eritrean Information Ministry, Ethiopian Forces crossed the border early on New Years Day 2010, and engaged in a fierce battle with Eritrean troops before quickly withdrawing back over the border, after having 10 soldiers killed and 2 taken prisoner. Ethiopian government spokesman Bereket Simon denied that any armed incursion had taken place.

Economy 
Kuwaiti Prime Minister Sheikh Nasser Mohammed Al-Ahmed Al-Sabah announced in July 2009, during a 3-day visit to Ethiopia, that his country would provide a $63 million loan to Ethiopia, part of which would be used to build a road between Wukro and Zalambessa.

On 11 September 2018, the Serha-Zalambesa border crossing of Eritrea-Ethiopia border reopens for the first time since 1998.

Demographics 
Based on figures from Ethiopia the Central Statistical Agency of Ethiopia released in 2005, Zalambessa has an estimated total population of 10,551, of whom 5,176 are men and 5,375 are women. The 1994 census reported it had a total population of 6,059 of whom 2,756 were males and 3,303 were females. It is not clear whether these census figures cover the entire area.

Economy 
The Commercial Bank of Ethiopia re-opened its Zalambessa Branch in on 12 February, 2009.

References

Populated places in the Tigray Region
Subdivisions of Ethiopia